Mikhail Sedyankov (born 8 April 1982) is a Bulgarian alpine skier. He competed in two events at the 2006 Winter Olympics.

References

1982 births
Living people
Bulgarian male alpine skiers
Olympic alpine skiers of Bulgaria
Alpine skiers at the 2006 Winter Olympics